Gary Bryant Jr. is an American football wide receiver for the USC Trojans.

Early life and high school
Bryant grew up in Riverside, California and attended Centennial High School in Corona, California. As a senior he caught 58 passes 1,134 yards and ten touchdowns. Bryant committed to play college football at USC during the 2020 All-American Bowl.

College career
Bryant caught seven passes for 51 yards and returned eight kickoffs for a team leading 210 yards during his freshman season. He became a starter during his sophomore season. Bryant finished the season with 44 receptions for 579 yards and seven touchdowns and also returned 11 punts for 50 yards and 16 kickoffs for 413 yards.

References

External links
USC Trojans bio

Living people
Players of American football from Riverside, California
American football wide receivers
USC Trojans football players
Year of birth missing (living people)